Amaszonas S.A. operating as Amas (legally as Compañía de Servicios de Transporte Aéreo Amaszonas S.A.) is an airline based in Bolivia, headquartered in Santa Cruz de la Sierra with its administrative center in La Paz. It operates scheduled and chartered short-haul passenger flights throughout the northern and northeastern regions of the country as well as to neighboring Brazil, Argentina, Peru, Chile and Paraguay, with its network's hub being located at El Alto International Airport.

History
The company was founded on October 1, 1998, but flight services were only commenced in 2000. Initially, Amaszonas operated chartered flights using a small fleet of turboprop airliners of the types Cessna 208 Caravan and Fairchild Swearingen Metroliner. In 2012, following the demise of AeroSur, five Bombardier CRJ200 were 
acquired from Avmax Aircraft Leasing Inc. in order to launch scheduled passenger services. The first one of these 50-seat jet aircraft was put in service in late August on the La Paz-Santa Cruz de la Sierra route.

In late 2014, Amaszonas announced it would lease 9 CRJ200 aircraft to expand its regional network and intended to fly to up to 40 destinations by 2017.

In 2015, Amaszonas purchased the Uruguayan BQB Líneas Aéreas 5 days after the company shut down its operations due to a crisis that began in 2014. From May 4, the airline took over the routes operated by BQB before the closure of operations, which were Aeroparque Jorge Newbery and Silvio Pettirossi International Airport.

In August 2021, Nella Linhas Aéreas, a Brazilian-based company registered in the U.S., had acquired 100% control over Amaszonas. Nella announced a strategic partnership with Boeing on 29-Jul-2021 and it was expecting delivery of a Boeing 737-500 in August 2021. However, such aircraft has not been delivered as of January 2023. Brasília International Airport is the main international airport in Brazil's capital, Brasília and is planned to be the primary hub of Nella.

Former subsidiaries
 Amaszonas Paraguay
 Amaszonas Uruguay

Destinations
As of December 2022, Amaszonas offers scheduled flights to the following destinations:

Interline agreements
As of April 2014, Amaszonas had interline agreements with the following airlines:
Air Europa
Hahn Air
GOL Airlines

As of January 2022, only Air Europa maintains an E-Ticket Interlineal agreement which allows the airlines to use the KIU System (Amadeus) to generate reservations in the domestic destination served by Amaszonas.

Fleet

Current fleet

The Amaszonas fleet consists of the following aircraft (as of January 2023):

Former fleet
The airline previously operated the following aircraft:

Incidents

On 10 July 2001 at 16:47 local time, the two pilots of an Amaszonas Cessna 208 Caravan (registered CP-2395) carrying eleven passengers had to execute an emergency landing on a hill near Viacha, six minutes into a flight from La Paz to Rurrenabaque, due to an engine problem. When hitting the ground, the aircraft turned over and was destroyed, but all persons on board survived.
On 25 January 2005 at around 10:00 local time, another Amaszonas Caravan (registered CP-2412) crash-landed, this time near Colquiri. The aircraft with two pilots and ten passengers on board had been on a chartered flight from La Paz to Sucre, when it encountered atmospheric icing conditions, thus being unable to maintain height. There were no fatalities, but as a consequence, Amaszonas was stripped of the allowance to operate Caravans on passenger flights.
On 27 February 2011 at 15:10 local time, an Amaszonas Fairchild Metro 23 (registered CP-2473)  was substantially damaged when the left landing gear collapsed upon landing at El Alto International Airport. The aircraft carrying six passengers and two crew members had been on a scheduled flight from San Borja to Rurrenabaque when problems with the undercarriage occurred, leading the pilots to divert to La Paz. All persons on board survived the ensuing crash landing.
 On November 9, 2017, an Amaszonas Uruguay Canadair CRJ-200 was operating flight 749 from Asuncion, Paraguay to Montevideo, Uruguay and suffered a tyre explosion at the gate damaging another aircraft and seriously injuring a ground worker. The worker was taken to a military hospital where he had both legs amputated. The airline postponed all operations of November 10 and reestablished services on November 11.

See also
List of airlines of Bolivia

Notes

References

External links

Official website 
Official website 

Airlines of Bolivia
Airlines established in 1998
Bolivian companies established in 1998
La Paz